Toxoscelus is a genus of beetles in the family Buprestidae, containing the following species:

 Toxoscelus acutipennis Fisher, 1922
 Toxoscelus amamiensis Kurosawa, 1963
 Toxoscelus auriceps (Saunders, 1873)
 Toxoscelus binodosus Descarpentries & Villiers, 1967
 Toxoscelus borneensis Obenberger, 1935
 Toxoscelus carbonarius Obenberger, 1958
 Toxoscelus centralis Deyrolle, 1864
 Toxoscelus cobosi Baudon, 1968
 Toxoscelus cupreoviridescens Obenberger, 1935
 Toxoscelus disponsae Baudon, 1962
 Toxoscelus eylandtus Bellamy & Peterson, 2000
 Toxoscelus funebris Deyrolle, 1864
 Toxoscelus fuscus Bourgoin, 1923
 Toxoscelus javanicus Obenberger, 1935
 Toxoscelus kurosawai Ohmomo & Akiyama, 1988
 Toxoscelus laosensis Baudon, 1968
 Toxoscelus mandarinus (Obenberger, 1917)
 Toxoscelus matobai Tôyama, 1985
 Toxoscelus miwai Kurosawa, 1977
 Toxoscelus nakajimai Ohmomo, 2002
 Toxoscelus omega Baudon, 1968
 Toxoscelus parvus Obenberger, 1924
 Toxoscelus purpureomicans Kerremans, 1890
 Toxoscelus queenslandicus Bellamy & Peterson, 2000
 Toxoscelus rondoni Baudon, 1968
 Toxoscelus rugicollis Saunders, 1874
 Toxoscelus sacer Obenberger, 1924
 Toxoscelus sasakii Kurosawa, 1957
 Toxoscelus similis Gebhardt, 1928
 Toxoscelus singularis Kerremans, 1900
 Toxoscelus speciosus Fisher, 1930
 Toxoscelus sterbai Obenberger, 1934
 Toxoscelus undatus Deyrolle, 1864
 Toxoscelus vicinus Obenberger, 1935
 Toxoscelus yakushimensis Kurosawa, 1957
 Toxoscelus yokoyamai Kurosawa, 1977

References

Buprestidae genera